Through a Big Country: Greatest Hits is a greatest hits album released by the Scottish rock band Big Country in 1990. It reached No. 2 on the albums chart in the UK. The tracks 2, 3, 4, 5, 6, 7, 10, 17 were produced by Steve Lillywhite; the tracks 8, 11, 15, 16 were produced by Robin Millar; the tracks 9, 13, 14 were produced by Peter Wolf; a new song - track 1 produced by Tim Palmer.

Track listing
"Save Me" -5:30 Previously unreleased
"In a Big Country" - 3:56 from The Crossing
"Fields of Fire (400 Miles)" - 3:34 from The Crossing
"Chance" - 4:41 from The Crossing
"Wonderland" - 3:58 Single-only release
"Where the Rose Is Sown" - 4:12 from Steeltown
"Just a Shadow" - 4:26 from Steeltown
"Look Away" - 4:26 from The Seer
"King of Emotion" - 4:53 from Peace in Our Time
"East of Eden" - 4:13 from Steeltown
"One Great Thing" - 4:03 from The Seer
"The Teacher" - 4:08 from The Seer
"Broken Heart (Thirteen Valleys)" - 4:48 from Peace in Our Time
"Peace in Our Time" - 4:36 from Peace in Our Time
"Eiledon" - 5:38 from The Seer
"The Seer" - 5:26 from The Seer
"Harvest Home" - 4:20 from The Crossing

References

1990 greatest hits albums
Big Country albums